Venusia kasyata is a moth in the family Geometridae first described by Wiltshire in 1966. It is found in Afghanistan.

References

Moths described in 1966
Venusia (moth)